Ézio Leal Moraes Filho (May 15, 1966 – November 9, 2011), best known as Ézio or Super-Ézio, was a Brazilian football player in striker role. He was born in Ponte de Itabapoana (currently Mimoso do Sul).

During his career (1986–1998) he played for Bangu, Olaria, Portuguesa, Fluminense (he scored for this club 118 goals in 236 matches), Atlético Mineiro, Americano Rio, CFZ do Rio, Rio Branco-ES and Internacional Limeira. He won, as a Fluminense player, one Rio de Janeiro State Championship in 1995, and two Guanabara Cup titles, in 1991 and 1993.

Ézio died of pancreatic cancer on November 9, 2011, in Rio de Janeiro. He was 45 years old.

References

External links
 

{{DEFAULTSORT:Ezio 
1966 births
2011 deaths
Brazilian footballers
Association football forwards
Campeonato Brasileiro Série A players
Americano Futebol Clube players
Clube Atlético Mineiro players
Bangu Atlético Clube players
Fluminense FC players
Associação Atlética Internacional (Limeira) players
Olaria Atlético Clube players
Associação Portuguesa de Desportos players
Deaths from pancreatic cancer
Deaths from cancer in Rio de Janeiro (state)